Zapalac is a Czech surname. Notable people with the surname include:

 Bill Zapalac (born 1948), American football player
 Petr Zapalač (born 1987), Czech footballer
 Willie Zapalac (1920–2010), American football coach

Czech-language surnames